The following is a timeline of the history of the city of Vladivostok, Primorsky Krai, Russia.

19th century

 1858 - Territory ceded to Russia by China per Treaty of Aigun.
 1860 - June: Russian ship Manchzhur arrives; military barracks constructed under command of Nikolay Vasilyevich Komarov.
 1864 - Kunst & Albers in business.
 1865 - Vladivostok designated a free port.
 1871
 Okhotsk Military Flotilla based in Vladivostok.
 Japan-Vladivostok telegraph cable installed.
 Amerikanskaya Street laid out.
 1877 - Maritime navigation light established.
 1880
 Vladivostok designated a city.
 Population: 7,300.
 1881 - Vladivostok Police directorate formed.
 1883
 Resettlement administration established.
 Coat of arms tiger design adopted.
 Vladivostok newspaper begins publication.
 1884 - Society for the Study of the Amur Region established.
 1887 - Public reading-hall opens.
 1888 - Oblast governor's residence related to Vladivostok from Khabarovsk.
 1890 - Amurskiy Regional Museum opens.
 1891 - May: Nicholas II visits city.
 1892 - Far East newspaper begins publication.
 1894 - State Bank branch opens.
 1897 - Population: 28,896.
 1898 - Russo-Chinese Bank branch opens.
 1899
 Oriental Institute opens.
 Advertiser newspaper begins publication.
 1900
 Population: 38,000.
 Ceased to be a free port.

20th century

 1902 - Vladivostok Sea School of Far Navigation founded.
 1903 - Trans-Siberian Railway begins operating.
 1906 - January: Armed revolt.
 1907
 Siberian Bank branch opens.
 October: Armed revolt.
 Winter: After a multitude of alleged paranormal incidents and multiple crew deaths, the Ivan Vassili is burned by drunken sailors.
 1908 - Tram begins operating.
 1909 - Population: 90,100.
 1912
 Train station built.
 Theater and Music begins publication.
 1917 - December: Japanese military occupies railroad.
 1918
Vladivostok Fortress constructed.
 April 4: Three Japanese killed.
 April 5: United States, Japanese, and British military stationed in city.
 1920 - April: United States military withdraws from city.
 1922 - October 25: Red Army in power.
 1930s - Transit prisons established.
 1930
 Far Eastern Politechnical Institute established.
 Moscow-Vladivostok automotive rally conducted.
 1931 - Maxim Gorky Academic Theater founded.
 1932 - Airfield begins operating.
 1942 - A Doolittle Raid B-25 makes an emergency landing in Valdivostok.
 1954 - Krushchev visits city.
 1957 - Dynamo Stadium opens.
 1958
 Vladivostok designated a closed city.
 Vladivostok State Medical Institute established.
 Football Club Luch formed.
 1960 - Centennial Prospect (street) laid out.
 1965 - Population: 367,000.
 1967 - Far Eastern Technological Institute founded.
 1974 - November: USA-USSR arms control summit held.
 1985 - Population: 600,000.
 1988 - City opens to Soviet citizens.
 1990 - Vladimir Yefremov becomes mayor.
 1991
 Sister city relationship established with San Diego, USA.
 Vladivostok's closed city status ends.
 1992
 Pacific Economic Development & Cooperation Center established.
 August: Asia-Pacific Theatre Festival held.
 1993 - Viktor Cherepkov becomes mayor.
 1994 - Tolstoshein Konstantin Borisovich becomes mayor.
 1996
 September 21: VladiROCKstok music festival held.
 Viktor Cherepkov becomes mayor again.
 1998 - Youry Kopylov becomes mayor.
 1999 - Spartak Primorye basketball club formed.
 2000 - City becomes part of the Far Eastern Federal District.

21st century

 2003 - Pacific Meridian film festival begins.
 2004 - Vladimir Nikolayev elected mayor.
 2005 - Czechoslovak Legions Graveyard renovated.
 2006 - Vladivostok Times news site begins publication.
 2008
  becomes mayor.
 December: Protest.
 2009 - Protests.
 2010
 November: International Youth Tiger Summit held.
 Population: 592,100.
 2011 - Sakhalin–Khabarovsk–Vladivostok pipeline opens.
 2012
 Zolotoy Rog Bridge and Russky Bridge built.
 September: Asia-Pacific Economic Cooperation summit held on Russky Island.

See also
 History of Vladivostok
 Pacific Fleet (Russia)
 
 Other names of Vladivostok
 List of cities and towns in the Russian Far East

References

This article incorporates information from the Russian Wikipedia and German Wikipedia.

Bibliography

Published in 19th century
 
 
 

Published in 20th century
 
 
 
 
 
 
 

Published in 21st century

External links

 
Vladivostok